Mehmed Alispahić (born 24 November 1987) is a Bosnian professional footballer who plays as an attacking midfielder.

Club career
Alispahić began his career with Iskra Bugojno in the First League of FBiH. He then joined Croatian 1. HNL club Šibenik in 2008. In May 2011, Alispahić agreed to a transfer to Dinamo Zagreb, where he stayed for a year and a half, before moving on a free transfer to Rijeka in late December 2012.

After a short spell at Sarajevo, he returned to Šibenik. On 1 June 2016, he and Jamilu Collins missed their penalties in a penalty shoot-out against Istra 1961 and Istra gained promotion, while Šibenik remained in the second tier.

After leaving Šibenik in the summer of 2018, he signed with Bosnian Premier League club Sloboda Tuzla in June of that same year. After only one season of playing for the club, Alispahić left Sloboda in June 2019.

On 20 June 2019, he signed a two year contract with Željezničar. Alispahić made his official debut for Željezničar on 20 July 2019, in a 0–0 home league draw against Borac Banja Luka. He scored his first goal for Željezničar in a thrilling 5–2 home league match, Sarajevo derby win against his former club Sarajevo on 31 August 2019. Alispahić left Željezničar on 2 July 2021.

International career
After an impressive finish to the 2009–10 season with Šibenik, including some spectacular goals, he received his first call-up to the Bosnia and Herzegovina national team in May 2010 for the friendly matches against Sweden and Germany. 

He made his debut against Sweden, coming on as a substitute in the second half, and has earned a total of 4 caps, scoring no goals. His final international was a May 2012 match against Mexico.

Personal life
Alispahić's younger brother Sabit is also a professional footballer who plays as a left-back for First League of FBiH club Igman Konjic.

Career statistics

Club

International
International caps and goals

Honours
Dinamo Zagreb
1. HNL: 2011–12
Croatian Cup: 2011–12

Rijeka
Croatian Cup: 2013–14

Sarajevo
Bosnian Premier League: 2014–15

References

External links
 
Mehmed Alispahič at Sofascore

1987 births
Living people
People from Bugojno
Association football midfielders
Bosnia and Herzegovina footballers
Bosnia and Herzegovina international footballers
NK Iskra Bugojno players
HNK Šibenik players
GNK Dinamo Zagreb players
HNK Rijeka players
FK Sarajevo players
Al-Ahli Club (Manama) players
FK Sloboda Tuzla players
FK Željezničar Sarajevo players
First League of the Federation of Bosnia and Herzegovina players
Croatian Football League players
Premier League of Bosnia and Herzegovina players
First Football League (Croatia) players
Bahraini Premier League players
Bosnia and Herzegovina expatriate footballers
Expatriate footballers in Croatia
Bosnia and Herzegovina expatriate sportspeople in Croatia
Expatriate footballers in Bahrain
Bosnia and Herzegovina expatriate sportspeople in Bahrain